Ascalenia beieri is a moth in the family Cosmopterigidae. It was described by Kasy in 1968. It is found in Sudan.

References

Natural History Museum Lepidoptera generic names catalog

Moths described in 1968
Ascalenia
Moths of Africa